Rhene obscura is a jumping spider species in the genus Rhene that lives in the Yemen. The female was first described in 2007.

References

Spiders described in 2007
Spiders of the Arabian Peninsula
Salticidae